This article covers known hyperaccumulators, accumulators or species tolerant to the following: Aluminium (Al), Silver (Ag), Arsenic (As), Beryllium (Be), Chromium (Cr), Copper (Cu), Manganese (Mn), Mercury (Hg), Molybdenum (Mo), Naphthalene, Lead (Pb), Selenium (Se) and Zinc (Zn).

See also:
Hyperaccumulators table – 2 : Nickel
Hyperaccumulators table – 3 : Cd, Cs, Co, Pu, Ra, Sr, U,        radionuclides, hydrocarbons, organic solvents, etc.

Hyperaccumulators table – 1 

Cs-137 activity was much smaller in leaves of larch and sycamore maple than of spruce: spruce > larch > sycamore maple.

References

+01
Hyperaccumulators|+01
Pollution control technologies
Lists of plants
Science-related lists
Pollution-related lists
Botany